2001 Milan Indoor, David Adams and John-Laffnie de Jager were the defending champions but only Adams competed that year with Marius Barnard.

Adams and Barnard lost in the first round to Julien Boutter and Fabrice Santoro.

Paul Haarhuis and Sjeng Schalken won in the final 7–6(7–5), 7–6(7–4) against Johan Landsberg and Tom Vanhoudt.

Seeds

  Mahesh Bhupathi /  Dominik Hrbatý (first round)
  David Adams /  Marius Barnard (first round)
  Michael Hill /  Jeff Tarango (semifinals)
  Johan Landsberg /  Tom Vanhoudt (final)

Draw

References
 2001 Milan Indoor Doubles Draw

Milan Indoor
2001 ATP Tour
Milan